Kagiso Gofaone Molapi (born 7 July 1990) is a Botswanan football defender who currently plays for Jwaneng Galaxy.

References

1990 births
Living people
Botswana footballers
Botswana international footballers
Botswana Police XI SC players
Jwaneng Galaxy F.C. players
Association football defenders